Leipzig (official name: Landkreis Leipzig) is a district (Kreis) in the Free State of Saxony, Germany. It is named after the city Leipzig, which is partly surrounded by the district, but not part of it. It borders (from the west and clockwise) the state Saxony-Anhalt, the urban district Leipzig, the districts Nordsachsen and Mittelsachsen, and the state Thuringia.

Geography 
The district is located in the Leipzig Bay and is rather flat. Individual hills are found in the north (Hohburg Hills) and south of the district. Its larger rivers are the Mulde, Pleiße and White Elster. Also worth mentioning are the many lakes of the Leipzig Neuseenland in the west of the county, that were formed by flooding old brown coal pits.

History 
The district was established by merging the former districts Muldentalkreis and Leipziger Land as part of the district reform of August 2008.

Geography 
The district is located in the lowlands around Leipzig. The main rivers of the district are the Mulde, the White Elster and the Pleiße.

Towns and municipalities 

{|
! colspan=2 align=left width=50%|Towns
! colspan=2 align=left width=50%|Municipalities
|- valign=top
||
Bad Lausick
Böhlen
Borna
Brandis
Colditz
Frohburg
Geithain
Grimma
Groitzsch
Kitzscher
||
Markkleeberg
Markranstädt
Naunhof
Pegau
Regis-Breitingen
Rötha
Trebsen 
Wurzen
Zwenkau
||
Belgershain
Bennewitz
Borsdorf
Elstertrebnitz
Großpösna
Lossatal
||
Machern
Neukieritzsch
Otterwisch
Parthenstein
Thallwitz
|}

References

External links 

  (German)